Blagoveshchenka is an urban locality (work settlement) and the administrative center of Blagoveshchensky District of Altai Krai, Russia. Population:

Geography 
Blagoveshchenka is located between the Kuchuk lake to the SSW and the Kulunda lake to the northeast. Stepnoye Ozero is the nearest rural locality.

References

Notes

Sources

Urban-type settlements in Altai Krai